Bhoun is a town in Kahuta Tehsil of Rawalpindi District, Punjab, Pakistan. Bhoun Qasba is situated 14 kilometers away and East from Tehsil Kahuta. The town has a population of 4,500 (approximately). Inhabitants of Bhoun speak Potohari. The Potohari culture, which prevails throughout the Tehsil Kahutta, arose from this region. The native dress of the town residents is Shalwar Kameez.

Clean drinking water is not available since water supply lines are not within reach of the town. Instead, residents have wells in their homes. Community wells are also available.

One primary school is available in the town and most children and young people travel to other areas for education. The town's literacy rate is improving.

The area has traditionally relied upon agriculture for employment due to local fertile soil. Wheat and corn crops were planted and produced in large amounts. The local major source of occupation is no longer farming, following technical education initiatives which have resulted in locals working in increasing numbers for the government and private organisations.

The Mainhtob Shrine is also located in the proximity of the town and is visited by locals frequently.

References

Populated places in Rawalpindi District